Myc-associated zinc finger protein is a protein that in humans is encoded by the MAZ gene.

Interactions 
MAZ (gene) has been shown to interact with BPTF and Deleted in Colorectal Cancer.

References

Further reading